Javad Sa'd al-Dowleh ( ‎;1856 in Khoy– February 3, 1930 in Tehran), was a Prime Minister of Qajar era Iran Sa'd al-Dowleh was Iran's Ambassador to Belgium from 1893 to 1896.

References

1856 births
1930 deaths
Prime Ministers of Iran
Ambassadors of Iran to Belgium
People of Qajar Iran